Pinto Bean was a squirrel on the campus of the University of Illinois Urbana-Champaign that was renowned and named for its rare piebald pattern. It died in Champaign on October 8, 2022, presumably due to a motor vehicle collision. Pinto Bean has been called a "minor celebrity" and a "grassroots, unofficial mascot" for the university. During a home football game against Minnesota, a tribute to Pinto Bean was shown on the jumbotron at Memorial Stadium.

Pattern 

A piebald Eastern gray squirrel, Pinto Bean was named for its distinctive mixture of gray fur with patches of unpigmented white fur, inspired by the spotted beans of the same name. According to Illinois Natural History Survey director Eric Shauber, this was the result of a rare genetic mutation that affected where melanin was distributed in the squirrel's body. Shauber said the mutation was rare enough to assume that there was only one such squirrel on campus.

Death and taxidermy 
Pinto Bean was found dead on the side of Springfield Avenue in Champaign on October 8, 2022. Its cause of death was presumably a vehicular collision. News of its death quickly spread on the r/UIUC subreddit. One user, Champaign resident Clark Jackson, retrieved the squirrel's remains and delivered them to a taxidermist in Bloomington in an effort to preserve the squirrel.

Tributes 

During Illinois's October 15, 2022, home football game against Minnesota, the jumbotron at Memorial Stadium displayed a tribute to Pinto Bean at halftime. The screen displayed an image of Pinto Bean, accompanied by the message: "RIP to Pinto Bean the Squirrel, forever in our hearts."

The Illinois Wildlife and Conservation Club held a moment of silence in remembrance of Pinto Bean. Students and community members shared many tributes and eulogies on r/UIUC.

See also 
Tommy Tucker (squirrel)

References 

Individual squirrels
Individual animals in the United States
University of Illinois Urbana-Champaign
2022 animal deaths